In finance, profit taking (or taking profits) is the practice of selling an asset, mostly shares, when the asset has risen in price. This allows investors to convert the increase of an asset's market value into cash.

Profit taking by a number of investors normally causes the price of the asset in question to fall temporarily. Nevertheless, the occasion of profit taking itself indicates an upward market trend.

External links
 Definition from Investopedia
 Definition from BusinessDictionary
 Definition from InvestorWords
 Definitions from TheFreeDictionary

Disinvestment
Stock market